Charles H. and Emma Condon House, also known as the Andrew J. Thompson House, is a historic home located at Frankfort, Clinton County, Indiana, United States.  It was built about 1902, and is a two-story, Queen Anne style frame dwelling on a brick foundation.  It has a clapboard and shingled exterior and an irregularly gabled and hipped roof.  It features a one-story wraparound porch with paired Doric order columns.  It was restored in the 1990s.

It was listed on the National Register of Historic Places in 1997.

References

Houses on the National Register of Historic Places in Indiana
Queen Anne architecture in Indiana
Houses completed in 1902
Buildings and structures in Clinton County, Indiana
National Register of Historic Places in Clinton County, Indiana